Boland's Mill is located on the Grand Canal Dock in Dublin, Ireland on Ringsend Road between the inner basin of Grand Canal Dock and Barrow Street. As of 2019, it was undergoing a €150 million reconstruction to become Bolands Quay, a development of new residences and commercial, retail, and civic spaces. The site, originally associated with Boland's Bakery, includes a number of 19th century warehouses.

History

Mill development
The mill site includes a number of buildings that were formerly owned by Boland's Bakery. There are two six-storey stone warehouse buildings dating from the 1830s, and others on Barrow Street dating from the 1870s. In the several decades before its involvement in the rising, it was used as a flour mill. Much of the complex consisted of concrete silos built between the 1940s and 1960s. The mill stopped production in 2001 and the site lay derelict pending development from that period until the redevelopment commenced in 2016.

Within the complex of buildings, the older 19th century calp limestone buildings facing onto Ringsend Road and Grand Canal Dock together with two terraced houses on Barrow street are protected structures. The taller concrete silos on the site were not protected structures, and were demolished during the construction in 2017-2018.

During 1916 Rising
During the 1916 Easter Rising, the area around Boland's Mill (including what is now the Treasury Building and Boland's Bakery) was headquarters to the 3rd Battalion of Irish Volunteers under Éamon de Valera. From Easter Monday, 24 April 1916, a unit of Irish Volunteers occupied the area with a view to controlling the main approaches from Dún Laoghaire (then Kingstown) towards the city centre. De Valera raised a green flag with a golden harp, the symbol of an independent Ireland, on the mills.On Wednesday 26 April 1916, a detachment of Sherwood Foresters, sent to Dún Laoghaire from England, made their way into the city via Mount Street Bridge. The ensuring engagement, the Battle of Mount Street Bridge, saw the first direct engagement with the Boland's Mill garrison. While the west side of the mill was subject to "unceasing sniping, which lasted all the week up to Saturday", returned fire from the Boland's Mill garrison kept British forces at bay until Patrick Pearse's surrender order was received on 30 April. Patrick Whelan, an Irish Volunteer of the Boland's Mill garrison killed on 26 April 1916, was posthumously awarded the 1916 Medal.

Site control and planning

Current plans

Since 2015, the site has been undergoing a €150 million reconstruction that is due to be known as 'Bolands Quay', accommodating new residences, commercial, retail, and civic spaces.

On 2 December 2014 a site notice was posted which indicated plans for the site. This notice included details of:
 Building A - a two-storey building on the corner of Barrow Street and Ringsend Road, "to be retained and restored for retail/restaurant/cafe use", with new windows and an entrance on Ringsend Road
 Buildings B1-B5 - ranging from five to eight storeys, to "be retained and restored for office use, and retail/restaurant/cafe use at ground level"
 Building C - six storeys on Ringsend Road, and fronting the dock
 Building D - two storeys plus basement, currently 33 and 34 Barrow Street, retained and restored for retail/restaurant/cafe use.
 Factory building - two storey brick gables, to be partially demolished, with refurbishment to match that of building C, and planned for cultural/exhibition use.
 New Office Building 1 - five storeys increasing to 14 storeys (max. building height ), fronting Barrow Street and accommodating office use
 New Office Building 2 - five storeys increasing to 13 storeys (max. building height ), fronting Barrow Street and accommodating office use
 New Residential Building 3 - fifteen storeys (max. building height ), with 30 two-bedroom units and 2 three-bedroom units, with a reception at ground floor and gym at first floor
 Three new pedestrian routes from Barrow Street, new civic waterfront square adjacent to the dock, a bridge link along the dock connecting the square to McMahon Bridge (Ringsend Road), with a second open space to the south of the factory building.
 Three levels of underground parking under buildings 1, 2, and 3, and a new vehicular ramp to replace existing ramp alongside the Mason Hayes & Curran building.

The National Asset Management Agency took control of the site in late 2012. On 19 May 2014, it was reported that Google was considering the derelict site for further development of the company in the area. In May 2018, it was announced that Google had bought the site from the National Asset Management Agency for €300 million.

Previous plans
The Boland's Mill site initially had planning permission for an office, residential and retail/hotel redevelopment granted by the Dublin Docklands Development Authority (under Section 25 of the Dublin Docklands Development Authority Act, 1997). The site was sold to Versus Limited/Benton Properties for 42 million euros in 2004 and had planned to develop 67 apartments, two houses,  of office space, as well as retail and leisure facilities on the site.

The property collapsed in value by a significant 84 percent following the property market bust, from €61m in 2007 to €9.9m in 2009, according to accounts filed by Versus with the Companies Office. Versus owed parent company Benton €15.8m.

References

External links

 Sites of 1916: Boland’s Mill and Mount Street Bridge (RTÉ, Century Ireland)

Buildings and structures in Dublin (city)
Dublin Docklands
Ringsend
Office buildings in the Republic of Ireland
Skyscraper office buildings in the Republic of Ireland
Apartment buildings in the Republic of Ireland